{{Automatic taxobox
| name = Garrulus
| image = Cyprus jay (Garrulus glandarius glaszneri).jpg
| image_caption = G. glandarius glaszneri, Cyprus 
| taxon = Garrulus
| authority = Brisson, 1760
| type_species = Corvus glandarius| type_species_authority = Linnaeus, 1758
| subdivision_ranks = Species
| subdivision = * Garrulus glandarius Garrulus lanceolatus Garrulus lidthi}}Garrulus is a genus of Old World jays, passerine birds in the family Corvidae.

Taxonomy and systematics
The genus was established by French zoologist Mathurin Jacques Brisson in 1760. The type species is the Eurasian jay (Garrulus glandarius). The name Garrulus is a Latin word meaning chattering, babbling or noisy.

Species
Three species are recognized:

Former species
Formerly, some authorities also considered the following species (or subspecies) as species within the genus Garrulus:
 Purple-winged roller (as Garrulus Temminckii'')

References

 
Bird genera